Lawngtlai district is one of the eleven districts of Mizoram state in India. The district is bounded on the north by Lunglei district, on the west by Bangladesh, on the south by Myanmar and on the east by Saiha district. The district occupies an area of 2557.10 km2. Lawngtlai town is the administrative headquarters of the district.

The district shares its boundaries with Lunglei and Saiha districts on the north and south respectively. The inhabitants of the district are mainly the ethnic groups of tribals like Pang, Lai and Chakma, who are among the minor tribal communities of Mizoram. The main occupation is cultivation and the rural population largely depends on agriculture for their subsistence. The physical feature is mainly hilly except with long narrow strip of low-lying area along the western side of Chamdur Valley.

History
Prior to the arrival of the British in the late 19th century, the area which became Lawngtlai District was ruled by local chieftains, whose zones of control were often a single village or small group of villages. In 1888 the chief of the Fungkah village attacked a British surveying team and killed four men including a Lt. Stewart. The following year the British sent in a punitive expedition to pacify the area.  What became Lawngtlai District was incorporated into the South Lushai Hills and administered by the lieutenant governor of Bengal. In 1898 North and South Lushai Hills were merged into the Lushai Hills District and were administered as part of Assam.  In 1919, the Lushai Hills, along with some of the other hill districts, were declared "Backward Tracts" under the Government of India Act, and in 1935 this denomination was changed to "excluded area". In 1952 the creation of the Lushai Hills Autonomous District Council removed the last power of the local chieftains. The area became part of Mizoram when the Union Territory of Mizoram was created in 1972, and remained a part of it when the state was created in 1987. Originally part of Chhimtuipui District, the area that became Lawngtlai District was divided into four rural development blocks: the Lawngtlai Rural Development Block with headquarters at Lawngtlai, Sangau Rural Development Block with headquarters at Sangau, Bungtlang South Rural Development Block with headquarters at Bungtlang South and the Chawngte Rural Development Block with headquarters at Chawngte. Lawngtlai district became a separate district on 11 November 1998.

Geography
Lawngtlai district is located in the southwesternmost part of Mizoram having international boundaries with Bangladesh to the west and Myanmar to the south. The district is bounded by Lunglei District to the north and Saiha District to the east. The Thega (Kawrpui) River forms most of the boundary with Bangladesh on the west and the Kaladan River forms the eastern boundary with Saiha District. Lawngtlai district occupied an area of 2557.10 km2 (2001 Census). The area is mountainous and hilly with a small strip of low-lying riverine plain along the western side of the Chamdur Valley. Landslides are common especially during rainy season. The western side of the district is covered by dense virgin forest. The main rivers include the Kaladan River, Tuichong River, the Chhimtuipui River, the Ngengpui River, the Chawngte River and the Tuiphal River.

Climate
Lawngtlai district has a moderate climate. In general, it is cool in summer and not very cold in winter. In winter the temperature varies from 8 °C to 24 °C and in summer, the temperature varies between 18 °C and 32 °C. The western part of the district has less elevation comparing to the eastern part, and hence it experiences a little warmer climate than the eastern part. Relative humidity is highest during the south-west monsoon when it reaches to about 85%. The district is under the direct influence of south-west monsoon and heavy precipitation is usually received from May to September every year. The average annual rainfall is about 2558 mm. The hottest period is from March to August every year. During the rainy season, it remains heavily clouded. There is an increase of cloudiness from March onwards. A clear and cool weather starts appearing from September and remains till January the next year.

Economy

One-third of the total inhabitants of Lawngtlai district rely entirely on agriculture, which is mostly based on traditional method of shifting cultivation. Only a small fraction of urban population is involved in permanent employment, such as state government service, bank and schools, and few engaged in small-scale business. The economic status of the district is in fact the lowest among the districts in Mizoram.

Zorinpui Integrated Check Post
Zorinpui Integrated Check Postin Lawngtlai district is an integrated immigration and customs check post that became operational in Oct 2017 to cater to the Kaladan Multi-Modal Transit Transport Project.  It is also open to tourist traffic.

Divisions
Unlike the most parts of India, where districts are divided into tehsils (talukas), in Lanwgtlai district there are two Autonomous District Councils, the Lai Autonomous District Council (LADC) and the Chakma Autonomous District Council (CADC) with their headquarters at Lawngtlai and Kamalanagar (Chawngte) respectively. Having separate autonomous legislative, executive and judicial functions, the Lais and the Chakmas administer their respective autonomous regions in accordance with the provisions of the Sixth Schedule to the Constitution of India.

This district is divided into four Rural Development Blocks:
 Chawngte Rural Development Block
 Bungtlang ‘South’ Rural Development Block
 Lawngtlai Rural Development Block
 Sangau Rural Development Block.

The town of Lawngtlai is the headquarters for the district. The names of the headquarters of the Rural Development Blocks are same as them. There are 158 villages in Lawngtlai district.

There are 3 Legislative Assembly constituencies in this district, 36-Tuichawng (ST), 37-Lawngtlai West (ST) and 38-Lawngtlai East (ST).

Demographics

According to the 2011 census Lawngtlai district has a population of 117,894, roughly equal to the nation of Grenada. This gives it a ranking of 611th in India (out of a total of 640). Its population growth rate over the decade 2001-2011 was 34.59%. Lawngtlai has a sex ratio of 945 females for every 1000 males, and a literacy rate of 65.88%.

Culture
The main communities occupying Lawngtlai District are the Lais, Chakmas, Tongchangya Bawm, Pang, etc. there are famous cultural heritage among such tribes. In the eastern side of the district where Lai community are the main inhabitants. Chawnglaizawnh, Sarlamkai, Pawhlohtlawh are the main cultural dances. In Chakma inhabited area of the district, there are various tribes of backward classes. In this area, the main religion is Buddhism whereas in the southern side i.e. Chamdur area mostly occupied by Pang, Bawm and Tlanglau community and eastern side i.e. Lai occupied area, Christianity is prevailing as their major religion. The common languages spoken in the district are Lai, Chakma, Tongchangya.  Other languages spoken include Pang, Tlanglau, Bru and Bawm. These communities have different fold dance, folk dance, folk tales of their own. The common cultural dances of the Chakmas are Nua Jhumo Naach and Biju Naach.

Flora and fauna
Lawngtlai district is situated within the tropical belt. It usually received high annual rainfall during the month from May up to September. In this region the tropical wet evergreen, mixed deciduous forest and wild banana forests are found. The western part of the region is covered by a thick virgin forest. Host of skima wallichi, Banyan tree, Gulmohar tree, Gamari, Jarus, Champa and several kinds of bamboos, climbers of different kinds and many kinds of wild fruits are found in this area. Several kinds of plants and herbs which are good for making herbal medicines are also found in this district.

References

External links
Lawngtlai district official website
District profile at Krishi Vigyan Kendra
Rainrays.com
Profile at Deputy Commissioner

 
Districts of Mizoram
Minority Concentrated Districts in India
1998 establishments in Mizoram